Mariana Larrabure de Orbegoso is a Peruvian beauty queen born in Lima city who became "Miss Peru World" in 1998 at the age of 22 years. She has also made a career in modeling in Peru.

Personal life
Born in Lima city, Larrabure de Orbegoso became Miss Peru in 1998 representing to La Libertad Region with the title of Miss La Libertad in the Peruvian national contest. She was top 10 in Miss World 1999.
Previously she started modeling at the early age of 14. She also studied to be a professional chef in Le Cordon Bleu Peru Culinary Arts School, she also attended courses of Graphic Design and went to Escuela Nacional Superior Autónoma de Bellas Artes to learn Painting and Sculpture.
Mujer Peruana Interview

See also
Trujillo Spring Festival
Miss La Libertad
Miss Peru

External links

References

Peruvian beauty pageant winners
Miss World 1998 delegates
Living people
Peruvian female models
People from Trujillo, Peru
1976 births